Hishām ibn ʿUrwah was a prominent narrator of hadith.

He was born in Medina in the year 61 A.H. (680 C.E.). His father was Urwah ibn al-Zubayr, the son of Zubayr ibn al-Awwam and Asma bint Abu Bakr, and his mother was an unnamed concubine.

He married Fatima bint Mundhir, and their children were al-Zubayr, Urwah and Muhammad.

As a narrator, Hisham is described as "reliable and firm, with a lot of hadith, and he was an authority." He narrated from his father, Urwah; from his wife, Fatima; and from Wahb ibn Kaysan. Among his pupils was Malik ibn Anas. The young Muhammad ibn Umar al-Waqidi also listened to him; however, al-Waqidi would have been only 16 years old when Hisham died.

Hisham died in Baghdad in 146 A.H. (763 C.E.)

See also
 Fatima bint Mundhir

References

8th-century Muslim scholars of Islam
Abu Bakr family
Tabi‘un hadith narrators
667 births
772 deaths
8th-century Arabs
Banu Asad (Quraysh)